Fremont Group is a private investment group based in San Francisco, California, United States. It was formerly known as Bechtel Investments up until 1993, reflecting its ownership by the Bechtel family. In 1993, its name was officially changed to Fremont Investors, Inc.

Organizations
The firm consists of three business areas:
 FPR Partners - a hedge fund
 Fremont Realty Capital - a real estate investment firm
 Fremont Ventures - a venture capital investment firm

In 2007, Calera Capital, a San Francisco-based private equity firm that spun out of the Fremont Group (its first institutional investor), changed its name from Fremont Partners as part of a rebranding effort in advance of raising its fourth private equity fund.

The Fremont Group also distinguishing itself from Fremont General Corp, a financial services company and Fremont Investment & Loan, a retail bank.

Controversy
On May 5, 2003, The New Yorker ran an article revealing that the bin Laden family had invested $10 million in The Fremont Group. The investments represented a small fraction of the assets managed by Fremont, which has counted former Secretary of State George P. Shultz as a director.

See also
Calera Capital

References

External links
Fremont Group (official website)

Bechtel
Companies based in San Francisco
Investment management companies of the United States
Hedge funds
Private equity firms of the United States